The Syntermitinae, also known as the mandibulate nasutes, is a neotropical subfamily of higher termites represented by 21 genera and 103 species. Majority of members of this subfamily have a soldier caste with a conspicuous horn-like projection from the fontanelle on the head, which is adapted for chemical defense; similar to the fontanellar gun of true nasute termites. However unlike true nasutes, the mandibles of the soldiers are functional and highly developed, and they are unable to expel their chemical weaponry at a distance – instead relying on direct physical contact. Some genera, such as Syntermes or Labiotermes, have a highly reduced nasus and in some species it may appear absent altogether. Although the Syntermitinae were once grouped and considered basal within the Nasutitermitinae, they are not closely related with modern cladistic analyses showing Syntermitinae to be a separate and distinct lineage that is more closely related to either the Amitermes-group or Microcerotermes Termitinae. It is believed the nasus evolved independently in Syntermitinae in an example of convergent evolution. Genera range from southern Mexico (Cahuallitermes) to Northern Argentina (Cornitermes, Procornitermes, Rhynchotermes, Syntermes) with the highest diversity occurring in the Brazilian Cerrado.

Identification

The frontal-gland aperture of soldiers is at the tip of a large projection (nasus) located in the frontal region of the head and the soldier mandibles have a recognizable molar plate and prominence. The first proctodeal segment (P1) of the gut in workers are similar across all genera, distinguished by a generally inflated and globose shape with diverse ornamentation arrangements specialized to certain feeding strategies.

Genera 
1. Acangaobitermes

2. Armitermes

3. Bandeiratermes

4. Biratermes

5. Cahuallitermes

6. Cornitermes

7. Curvitermes

8. Cyrilliotermes

9. Genuotermes

10. Ibitermes

11. Labiotermes

12. Macuxitermes

13. Mapinguaritermes

14. Noirotitermes

15. Paracurvitermes

16. Procornitermes

17. Rhynchotermes

18. Silvestritermes

19. Syntermes

20. Uncitermes

21. Vaninitermes

References 

Insect subfamilies
Termites